Simte may refer to:
Simte people
Simte language

Language and nationality disambiguation pages